The men's 100 meter running deer, double shots was a shooting sports event held as part of the Shooting at the 1924 Summer Olympics programme. It was the fourth appearance of the event. The competition was held on 1 July 1924 at the shooting ranges at Versailles. 31 shooters from 8 nations competed.

Results
A maximum of four competitors per nation were allowed. Every shooter fired 10 times two shots with points from 0 to 5 (5 was the best) so a maximum of 100 points was possible.

References

External links
 Official Report
 

Shooting at the 1924 Summer Olympics
100 meter running deer at the Olympics